Juho Liuksiala (born 2 November 1995) is a Finnish professional ice hockey player. He is currently playing for Sport of the Finnish Liiga.

Liuksiala made his Liiga debut playing with Ilves during the 2014–15 Liiga season.

References

External links

1995 births
Living people
Finnish ice hockey forwards
Ilves players
KOOVEE players
Lempäälän Kisa players
Vaasan Sport players